José Martínez (born 11 February 1950) is a Colombian weightlifter. He competed in the men's lightweight event at the 1972 Summer Olympics.

References

1950 births
Living people
Colombian male weightlifters
Olympic weightlifters of Colombia
Weightlifters at the 1972 Summer Olympics
Place of birth missing (living people)
Pan American Games medalists in weightlifting
Pan American Games gold medalists for Colombia
Pan American Games bronze medalists for Colombia
Weightlifters at the 1971 Pan American Games
20th-century Colombian people
21st-century Colombian people